Turlock Municipal Airport  is a public airport located eight miles (13 km) east of Turlock, in Merced County, California, United States. It was used during World War II to train pilots for air combat.

World War II

During World War II, the airport was designated as Ballico Air Force Auxiliary Field, and was an auxiliary training airfield for Merced Army Airfield, California.

See also

 California World War II Army Airfields

References

External links 

Airports in Merced County, California